Frank Wilkins (1897-1951) was an Australian rugby league footballer who played in the 1920s.

Frank 'Skinny' Wilkins was graded from the Hurstville juniors and played first grade for St. George during the club's foundation year in 1921. He made his first grade debut in a Round 3 game against Western Suburbs on 7 May 1921 at Pratten Park. He went on to play 8 first grade games for the Saints between 1921-1922 before retiring.

War service
Wilkins was also a veteran from World War I, serving in the 1st AIF between 1915–1918.

Death
Wilkins died on 18 August 1951 at St. Vincents Hospital, Darlinghurst, New South Wales.

References

St. George Dragons players
Australian rugby league players
Rugby league players from Sydney
Rugby league hookers
Rugby league second-rows
1897 births
1951 deaths
Australian military personnel of World War I